|}

The Ormonde Stakes is a Group 3 flat horse race in Great Britain open to horses aged four years or older. It is run over a distance of 1 mile, 5 furlongs and 84 yards at Chester in May.

History
The event is named after Ormonde, a famous racehorse foaled at Eaton Hall in Cheshire. The original version was a 5-furlong race for two-year-olds.

The present Ormonde Stakes was established in 1936. It was initially open to horses aged three or older, and contested over 1 mile, 5 furlongs and 75 yards. The first running was won by Quashed.

The race was confined to three-year-olds and cut to 1 mile, 2 furlongs and 10 yards in 1955. Its previous distance was restored in 1958, and from this point it was restricted to older horses. It was extended by several yards in 1970.

The Ormonde Stakes can serve as a trial for the Coronation Cup. The last horse to win both races in the same year was St Nicholas Abbey in 2011.

Records

Most successful horse (2 wins):
 Sovrango – 1962, 1963
 Shambo – 1993, 1994
 St Expedit – 2001, 2002

Leading jockey (5 wins):
 Lester Piggott – Primera (1959), Arctic Vale (1964), Biomydrin (1966), David Jack (1967), Quayside (1971)
 Pat Eddery – Oats (1977), Crow (1978), Teenoso (1984), Saddlers' Hall (1992), Sadian (1999)
 Ryan Moore - Harbinger (2010), St Nicholas Abbey (2011), Dartmouth (2016), Idaho (2018), Japan (2021)

Leading trainer (6 wins):
 Michael Stoute  - Saddlers' Hall (1992), Zilzal Zamaan (1995), Daliapour (2000), Ask (2007), Harbinger (2010), Dartmouth (2016)

Winners since 1980

Earlier winners

 1936: Quashed
 1937: Young England
 1938: Senor
 1939: Tricameron
 1940–45: no race
 1946: High Stakes
 1947: Turkish Tune
 1948: Goyama
 1949: Alycidon
 1950: Oleins Grace
 1951: Cagire II
 1952: Tulyar
 1953: Wyandank
 1954: Stem King
 1955: North Cone
 1956: Stephanotis
 1957: Hindu Festival
 1958: Doutelle
 1959: Primera
 1960: Light Horseman
 1961: Alcaeus
 1962: Sovrango
 1963: Sovrango
 1964: Arctic Vale
 1965: Indiana
 1966: Biomydrin
 1967: David Jack
 1968: Hopeful Venture
 1969: no race
 1970: Blakeney
 1971: Quayside
 1972: Selhurst
 1973: Ormindo
 1974: Crazy Rhythm
 1975: Rouser
 1976: Zimbalon
 1977: Oats
 1978: Crow
 1979: Remainder Man

See also
 Horse racing in Great Britain
 List of British flat horse races

References

 Paris-Turf:
 Racing Post:

 galopp-sieger.de – Ormonde Stakes.
 ifhaonline.org – International Federation of Horseracing Authorities – Ormonde Stakes (2019).
 pedigreequery.com – Ormonde Stakes – Chester.
 

Open long distance horse races
Chester Racecourse
Flat races in Great Britain
1936 establishments in England
Recurring sporting events established in 1936